All-Round Champion is a Canadian children's television series, which premiered in 2020. Hosted by Perdita Felicien, the series features several high-achieving teen athletes from both Canada and the United States, placing them in a competition scenario where they must train and compete in sports other than their own primary discipline, with the best-performing athlete crowned as the winner at the end of the season.

The series was produced by Marblemedia and based on the Norwegian series Best i mest. It was produced for TVOntario in Canada and BYU TV in the United States, and also later aired on Knowledge Network.

The show's renewal for a second season was announced before the first season began airing.

The series received a Canadian Screen Award nomination for Best Children's or Youth Non-Fiction Program or Series at the 9th Canadian Screen Awards in 2021.

Format 

All-Round Champion runs over the course of ten weeks. Each week, one of the athletes gets to showcase and coach their sport to their fellow competitors, alongside a sport star whose job is to not only coach the athletes, but also to award the medals and the shoutouts at the end of the week.

Each week would start with the athletes on their bus learning about the week's sport via a recorded message from the host, Perdita Felicien, which would air on a TV inside the bus.

After the announcement, the athletes would set off to a location where they partake in The Basics. The Basics is a day where the athletes do a fun activity which would relate to the week's sport. In season 3, The Basics was also an opportunity for one of the athletes to earn The Advantage, which would give them a leg-up over the rest on Competition Day.

Following The Basics, came the two Training Days. On the first day of Training, the athlete whose sport is one of the week, gets to showcase their sport in a demonstration. Following the demo, would be the announcement of the sport star, where they would introduce themselves and show off their medals.

Over the course of the two days, the athletes would train in the chosen sport, to learn and perfect their abilities for the all important Competition Day.

On Competition Day, the athletes all compete either individually or as a team (depending on the sport) in the sport. This where The Advantage comes into play, as the athlete in possession of it, would get an advantage in the competition, which could increase their chances of landing on The Podium.

At the end of the competition, would come The Podium. Where The Shoutouts and The Medals would be awarded. Shoutouts are individual awards worth ten points where the sport star would call out two athletes on their work ethic and improvement during the week.

The Medals are awards handed out to three (or more, depending on the sport) athletes who did the best in The Competition. Three medals would be handed out. One bronze, one silver and one gold, The Medals would also translate to points on The Leaderboard.

All the athletes who participated in the competition and did not receive a medal, nor a shoutout, would receive five points.

The Leaderboard would keep track of each athletes progress in points throughout the competition. A visual of The Leaderboard would air at the end of The Podium.

This format would continue until after the final sport, where the athletes would compete in the ARC-athlon.

In the ARC-athlon, all of the ten athletes would compete in five different events to gain more points to their final point tally. These events (except the team events) would still follow the point system of the medals, but also depending on how they placed in the event, they would also be awarded a certain number of points.

At the end of the ARC-athlon, would come The Final Podium, where Predita recognized each athletes journey throughout the competition, and would announce the All-Round Champion, which would be the athlete with most points on the leaderboard. They would also be awarded the All-Round Champion belt.

Season 1

Athletes

Episode Leaderboard

Final Leaderboard (After ARC-athlon)

References

External links

2020 Canadian television series debuts
2020s Canadian children's television series
2020s Canadian sports television series
TVO original programming
BYU TV original programming
Television series about teenagers